NECA or Neca may refer to:

 National Entertainment Collectibles Association, an American merchandise licensee of film and television for the enthusiast market
 National Electrical Contractors Association, an American trade association
 NECA Show, electrical construction industry’s trade show since 1901
 National Exchange Carrier Association, an American association of telephone common carriers
 Neca (footballer) (born 1979), real name João Alexandre Duarte Ferreira Fernandes, Portuguese footballer
 NECA Project, Net Environment for Embodied Emotional Conversational Agents
 Nitrous Oxide Emission Control Area, sea areas with regulated nitrous oxides emission caps
 North East Combined Authority, a local government body in North East England
 5′-(N-Ethylcarboxamido)adenosine (NECA), a reference agonist for adenosine G protein-coupled receptors; see Adenosine A2A receptor